Motteville is a commune in the Seine-Maritime department in the Normandy region in northern France.

Geography
SNCF operates a TER (train) train service here.

Population

Places of interest
 The church of St.Michel, dating from the thirteenth century.
 The Château Henri IV
 The sixteenth century fortified manorhouse.

See also
Communes of the Seine-Maritime department

References

External links

Official website of the commune 

Communes of Seine-Maritime